Herath Mudiyanselage Vijitha Herath (born 1 May 1968) is a Sri Lankan politician, former Cabinet Minister of Cultural Affairs & National Heritage and current member of the Parliament of Sri Lanka. He contested in the 2010 parliamentary election under the Democratic National Alliance (DNA) and was elected to parliament from Gampaha District.

Electoral history

References
 Parliament profile

Government ministers of Sri Lanka
Living people
Members of the 11th Parliament of Sri Lanka
Members of the 12th Parliament of Sri Lanka
Members of the 13th Parliament of Sri Lanka
Members of the 14th Parliament of Sri Lanka
Members of the 15th Parliament of Sri Lanka
Members of the 16th Parliament of Sri Lanka
Janatha Vimukthi Peramuna politicians
National People's Power politicians
United People's Freedom Alliance politicians
1968 births